Rockstedt is a municipality in the district Kyffhäuserkreis, in Thuringia, Germany.

The classical oboist Alfred Gleißberg was born in the city in 1864.

References

Municipalities in Thuringia
Kyffhäuserkreis